Alrad Lewis (born May 10, 1977), also known as Boola, is an American hip-hop producer, composer and artist. Growing up in Hempstead, Long Island, Boola started his own rap group with kids in the neighborhood. After taking on production responsibilities for the group, Boola decided to concentrate on the production aspect of the music business and soon began working with artists signed to Warner and MCA.

Music career 
In 2002, after producing for Warner and MCA Records, Boola signed a deal with Roc-A-Fella records. For the next seven years, Boola produced for and worked with artists such as Beanie Sigel, Cam'ron, Kanye West, Nicole Wray, Ne-Yo, Nas and Jaheim. After the Roc-A-Fella split, Boola continued to produce expanding into TV and film placements including VH1's Basketball Wives and MTV's Making With The Band. In 2011, Boola released the "Produced By Boola" mixtape series which featured original material from Nas, Ne-Yo, Bun B and others.  Shortly after he began to pursue a career as an artist, and in November 2012 appeared on BET's 106 & Park, to premiere his video "Starting 5".  It featured Maffew Ragazino, Mickey Factz, Reek Da Villian, and Jon Connor (produced by Bink).

Boola's latest project is a mixtape album No Better Time Than The Present and, along with "Starting 5", featured  the first single "Kim K".

Discography

Studio albums (artist) 
 2012: No Better Time Than The Present (Mixtape Album)

Mixtapes (artist/producer) 
 2011: Cut from a Different Cloth
 2011: Produced By Boola

Songs (producer) 
 2007: Beanie Sigel – H.H.E.H
 2007 N.O.R.E – I'ma Get You
 2006: Ne-Yo – I Ain't Gotta Tell You
 2006: Jaheim – The Chosen One
 2006: Cam'Ron – Something New
 2005: Beanie Sigel – Flatline, Oh Daddy, Tales of a Hustler
 2005: Nicole Wray – If I was Your Girlfriend
 2005: Rell – Real Love
 2005: Young Gunz – What We Gotta Do
 2005: Lost Boyz – Lets Go, My Way
 2004: Young Gunz – That's Right
 2004: Jim Jones – Capo Status,Take. 1 Take 2, Final Take
 2004: Diplomats – Duty Clap
 2003: State Property – Temporary Relief, State Prop You Know Us
 2003: GZA – Did Ya Say That

References 

1977 births
East Coast hip hop musicians
Living people